Oasis Academy Oldham is a coeducational secondary school with academy status for 11- to 16-year-olds in the Hollinwood area of Oldham, Greater Manchester, England.

The academy was formed from a merger of Kaskenmoor School in Hollinwood and South Chadderton School in Chadderton. The academy is sponsored by the Oasis Trust.

When in 2016 the Collective Spirit Free School was closed, Oasis Academy Oldham accepted many of the 230 displaced children into years 8,9,10 and 11.

History
The academy was formed in 2010 from a merger of Kaskenmoor School in Hollinwood and South Chadderton School in Chadderton. These schools had a reputation for indiscipline. It moved into its own buildings in September 2012. It was inspected by Ofsted in late November. They were complimentary of the behaviour of the students and the enthusiasm of the newly appointed headteacher but rated everything else to be inadequate.

The school was originally staffed by teachers from the preceding schools. In 2011, the previous principal left and 20 staff in August 2012: staffing was not stable, routines and procedures were not in place. The academy was already a larger than average secondary school with a smaller than average proportion of students from minority ethnic backgrounds. Over half the students were eligible for the pupil premium, i.e. on free school meals or in local authority care. The new principal had started in April. The school community followed Ofsted advice, and in May 2014  it left special measures. It still 'required improvement'.

In 2016 the school still 'required improvement'. When in 2016 the Collective Spirit Free School was closed, Oasis Academy Oldham accepted many of the 230 displaced children into years 8,9,10 and 11.

In 2018 it moved back into special measures as it was an inadequate school. Ofsted focused on pupil under-achievement. The most able pupils and disadvantaged pupils made exceptionally poor progress.

In July 2020, Ofsted reported back on the results of their Section 8 monitoring inspection. They approved the school's improvement plan and the trust's statement of action.

Description
Oasis Academy Oldham is part of the Oasis Community Learning group, and evangelical Christian charity. The trust have guided forty schools out of special measures. 19 per cent of the 52 Oasis academies classified as failing.
The trust's founder Reverend Steve Chalke says "Turning round a school is sometimes a quick fix, it really, truly is. And sometimes it’s a really long, hard, hard job".

Academics

Curriculum
Virtually all maintained schools and academies follow the National Curriculum, and there success is judged on how well they succeed in delivering a 'broad and balanced curriculum'. Schools endeavour to get all students to achieve the English Baccalaureate(EBACC) qualification- this must include core subjects a modern or ancient foreign language, and either History or Geography.

The academy operates a three-year, Key Stage 3 where all the core National Curriculum subjects are taught. This is a transition period from primary to secondary education, that builds on the skills, knowledge and understanding gained at primary school, and introduces youngsters who are starting from a lower than average base to wider, robust and challenging programmes of study needed to gain qualifications at Key Stage 4. They study English, Maths, Science, History, MFL, Geography, Art, Performing Arts, RE and Design plus Sport. They are provided with iPads and Knowledge organisers.

At Key Stage 4 the focus is on the EBACC, and there are daily Maths, English and Science lessons- plus some options. Spanish and French are the taught Modern Languages. Again knowledge organisers are used

References

External links
Oasis Academy Oldham official website
Willmott Dixon promotional animation

Secondary schools in the Metropolitan Borough of Oldham
Academies in the Metropolitan Borough of Oldham
Oldham
Schools in Oldham